The 2021 Rugby Championship was the ninth edition of the annual southern hemisphere competition, involving Argentina, Australia, New Zealand and South Africa. The Springboks returned to the tournament after a year out in 2020 due to South African government travel restrictions and player welfare and safety concerns related to COVID-19. The tournament returned to its normal window of August, kicking-off on 14 August and concluding on 2 October.

Sponsorships 
The competition was operated by SANZAAR, a joint venture of the four countries' national unions, and known for sponsorship reasons as The Castle Rugby Championship in South Africa, The Fortinet Rugby Championship in New Zealand, The eToro Rugby Championship in Australia, and The Zurich Rugby Championship in Argentina.

Travel disruptions
With continued restrictions relating to the COVID-19 pandemic, most of the tournament was staged in Australia and New Zealand, with South Africa also hosting two games - their two matches against Argentina in the opening two rounds.

On 3 August, the original schedule was altered due to travel restrictions imposed in New Zealand, meaning the first and second tests between Australia and New Zealand (Bledisloe 2 & 3) were reversed and rearranged, and New Zealand would play at Eden Park instead of Wellington Regional Stadium. The restrictions also meant that New Zealand would not host their tests against Argentina, and were eventually played in Australia.

On 24 August, it was announced that all games in Rounds 3–6 would be hosted in Queensland, Australia. This came after COVID restrictions in New Zealand meant South Africa (and Argentina who were already set to play the All Blacks at a neutral venue) were unable to travel to New Zealand. In addition, due to the uncertainty over the original scheduled for the Championship, the All Blacks also delayed their travel to Australia for their round 2 clash in Perth.

New laws trialed
The 2021 Rugby Championship became the first international competition to include the new World Rugby global rugby laws trials, designed to support the priority mission of head impact reduction and potential welfare advancements across the game. For some of the law adaptions, they had previously been trialed at Super Rugby level in Australia and New Zealand; the goal-line drop out and the 50:22, whilst the others are new to help reduce injury risk at the breakdown. In addition, outside the World Rugby global law trials, this years Rugby Championship will also trial a 20-minute red card which like the goal-line drop out and 50:22, had been used in Australia and New Zealand respective Super Rugby tournaments.
The championship was won by New Zealand after the 19-17 win against South Africa on 25 September.

Table

Fixtures

Round 1

Notes:
 New Zealand score their most points against Australia - previously 54 set in 2017.
 New Zealand retain the Bledisloe Cup.

Notes:
 Herschel Jantjies (South Africa) had been named on the bench but withdrew ahead of the game due to injury and was replaced by Jaden Hendrikse.
 Joseph Dweba and Jaden Hendrikse (South Africa) and Carlos Muzzio (Argentina) made their International debuts.

Round 2

Notes:
 Lucio Cinti and Ignacio Mendy and Nico Janse van Rensburg (South Africa) made their international debuts.
 Lood de Jager (South Africa) earned his 50th test cap.
 No replacement was issued for Jaden Hendrikse.

Notes:
 Samu Kerevi (Australia) became the first Australian player to play for the Wallabies after an amendment of the Giteau's law that allowed three players with less than the limit of 60 test caps to be picked.
 Jordie Barrett (New Zealand) became the first player at international level to receive a 20-minute red card.
 This was New Zealand's first ever match victory and their first ever win over Australia in Perth. 
 This was Australia's first defeat in Perth since 2009 when they lost to South Africa 25–32 in the 2009 Tri Nations at Subiaco Oval.

Round 3

Notes:
 Anton Lienert-Brown (New Zealand) was named to start but withdrew ahead of kick off and was replaced by Rieko Ioane, Quinn Tupaea replaced Ioane on the bench.
 Gonzalo García (Argentina) made his international debut.
 Nicolás Sánchez became Argentina's most capped player with 90, surpassing Agustín Creevy's record of 89 caps.
 This was New Zealand's first win in Queensland since 2014 when they beat Australia 29–28 in the 2014 third Bledisloe Cup match at Brisbane's Lang Park.

Notes:
 Allan Alaalatoa and Reece Hodge (both Australia) earned their 50th test caps.
 Feleti Kaitu'u and Rob Leota (both Australia) made their international debuts.

Round 4

Notes:
 Michael Hooper captained the Wallabies for a record breaking 60th time, surpassing the previous record of 59 set by George Gregan.
 Australia win back-to-back matches against South Africa for the first time since their 2015/2016 victories.
 Australia reclaim the Mandela Challenge Plate.

Notes:
 This was New Zealand's first win at Lang Park since 2014, when they beat Australia 29–28 in the third Bledisloe Cup match.
 New Zealand reclaimed the No.1 World Rugby Ranking.

Round 5

Notes:
 Luke Jacobson was named to start but withdrew ahead of kick-off with Ethan Blackadder replacing him in the starting XV. Hoskins Sotutu replaced Blackadder on the bench.
 Trevor Nyakane (South Africa) earned his 50th test cap.
 This was the 100th meeting between these two nations.
 New Zealand retain the Freedom Cup.

Notes:
 Mateo Carreras, Rodrigo Martínez and Joaquín Oviedo (all Argentina) made their international debuts.
 Australia retain the Puma Trophy.

Round 6

Notes:
 Eduardo Bello and Thomas Gallo (Argentina) both made their international debuts.
 Greg Holmes becomes the oldest player to represent the Wallabies at the age of 38 years and 113 days surpassing Tony Miller's record by one day.
 Australia win four matches in the Rugby Championship for the first time, while also winning four consecutive test matches (in any competition) for the first time since 2017.

Notes:
 South Africa came from behind at half-time (20–14) for the first time against New Zealand since their 24–23 win in 1998.
 This was South Africa's first win over New Zealand and their first win against New Zealand outside South Africa since 2018 when they beat New Zealand 36–34 in the 2018 Rugby Championship round match at New Zealand's Wellington Regional Stadium in Wellington. 
 This was South Africa's first game victory in Australia and in Queensland since 2013, when they beat Australia 38-12 during the 2013 Rugby Championship round match at Brisbane's Lang Park.

Statistics

Points scorers

Try scorers

Squads

Note: Ages, caps and clubs/franchises are of 14 August 2021 – the starting date of the tournament

Argentina
On 29 July, Argentina announced a 47-man roster for the 2021 Rugby Championship. On 30 September, Pablo Matera, Sebastián Cancelliere, Joaquín Díaz Bonilla, Felipe Ezcurra, Santiago Medrano and Santiago Socino were expelled from the tournament for breaching COVID-19 protocols.

Australia
On 25 July, Australia named a 42-man Wallabies squad for the 2021 Rugby Championship.

On 26 July, Quade Cooper was a late addition to the squad.

On 10 August, Samu Kerevi was added to the squad to be available for selection ahead of Australia's second round match (Bledisloe 3) against New Zealand in Perth.

New Zealand
The All Blacks 36-man squad for the 2021 Rugby Championship was named on 19 July.

South Africa
On 8 August 2021, a 42-man squad for the 2021 Rugby Championship was announced.

On 15 August, Jean-Luc du Preez was recalled to the squad

See also
 History of rugby union matches between Argentina and Australia
 History of rugby union matches between Argentina and New Zealand
 History of rugby union matches between Argentina and South Africa
 History of rugby union matches between Australia and South Africa
 History of rugby union matches between Australia and New Zealand
 History of rugby union matches between New Zealand and South Africa
 2021 July rugby union tests

References

Notes

2021 in Argentine rugby union
2021 in Australian rugby union
2021 in New Zealand rugby union
2021 in South African rugby union
2021 rugby union tournaments for national teams
August 2021 sports events in Africa
August 2021 sports events in New Zealand
September 2021 sports events in Australia
October 2021 sports events in Australia
2021